The first season of the television comedy series Community originally aired from September 17, 2009 on NBC to May 20, 2010 in the United States. The first three episodes aired at 9:30 pm ET before being moved to 8:00 pm ET. The show was picked up for 22 episodes in October 2009, and an additional 3 episodes were ordered later.

The show focuses on disbarred lawyer Jeff Winger, and his attempt to get a bachelor's degree at a community college, while he forms a bond with his Spanish study group.

Cast

Starring
 Joel McHale as Jeff Winger 
 Gillian Jacobs as Britta Perry 
 Danny Pudi as Abed Nadir 
 Yvette Nicole Brown as Shirley Bennett
 Alison Brie as Annie Edison 
 Donald Glover as Troy Barnes
 Ken Jeong as Señor Ben Chang
 Chevy Chase as Pierce Hawthorne

Recurring
 Jim Rash as Dean Craig Pelton 
 Dino Stamatopoulos as Alex "Star-Burns" Osbourne 
 Richard Erdman as Leonard Briggs 
 Erik Charles Nielsen as Garrett Lambert 
 Lauren Stamile as Professor Michelle Slater 
 John Oliver as Professor Ian Duncan 
 Eric Christian Olsen as Vaughn Miller 
 John Michael Higgins as Professor Eustice Whitman 
 Iqbal Theba as Gobi Nadir

Guest stars
 Jack Black as Buddy Austin ("Investigative Journalism")
 Blake Clark as Coach Herbert Bogner ("Physical Education")
 Tony Hale as Professor Marion Holly ("Beginner Pottery")
 Anthony Michael Hall as Mike Chilada ("Comparative Religion")
 Sharon Lawrence as Doreen ("The Politics of Human Sexuality")
 Lee Majors as Admiral Lee Slaughter ("Beginner Pottery")
 Katharine McPhee as Amber ("Basic Genealogy")
 Jerry Minor as Jerry the Janitor ("English as a Second Language")
 Patton Oswalt as Nurse Jackie ("Home Economics")
 Lisa Rinna as Mark's mother ("The Art of Discourse")
 Owen Wilson as Other Study Group's Leader ("Investigative Journalism", uncredited cameo)

Episodes

Production

Casting
Dan Harmon emphasized the importance of the cast to making the premise of the comedy work. "Casting was 95 percent of putting the show together," he said in an interview. He had worked with several of the cast members earlier; Joel McHale, John Oliver, and Chevy Chase all had cameo roles in episode 9 of Water and Power, the short film series produced by Harmon for Channel 101. Actor Chevy Chase had long been a favorite of Harmon. Though principally not very partial to sitcoms, Chase was persuaded to take the job by the quality of the show's writing. Harmon saw similarities between Chase and the character he plays on the show. Though Chase has often been ridiculed for his career choices, Harmon believed this role could be redeeming: "What makes Chevy and Pierce heroic is this refusal to stop." Harmon had to warn Chase against playing a "wise-ass" the way he often does in his roles, since the character of Pierce is a rather pathetic figure who is normally the butt of the joke himself.

McHale, known from the E! comedy talk show The Soup, was also (like Chase) impressed by Harmon's writing. He commented that "Dan's script... was so head and shoulders above everything else that I was reading." McHale appealed to Harmon because of his likeable quality, which allowed the character to possess certain unsympathetic traits without turning the viewer against him. For the role of Annie, Harmon wanted someone who would resemble Tracy Flick, Reese Witherspoon's character from the 1999 film Election. Originally the producers were looking for a Latina or Asian Tracy Flick. Instead they ended up casting Alison Brie, known from her role as Trudy Campbell on Mad Men.

Development
The premise of Community was based on Harmon's real-life experiences. In an attempt to save his relationship with his then-girlfriend, he enrolled in Glendale Community College northeast of Los Angeles, where they would take Spanish together. Harmon got involved in a study group and, somewhat against his own instincts, became closely connected to the group of people with whom he had very little in common. "...I was in this group with these knuckleheads and I started really liking them," he explains, "even though they had nothing to do with the film industry and I had nothing to gain from them and nothing to offer them." With this as the background, Harmon wrote the show with a main character largely based on himself.  He had, like Jeff, been self-centered and independent to the extreme before he realized the value of connecting with other people.

About the creative process behind the writing, Harmon says that he had to write the show as if it were a film, not a sitcom. Essentially, he says, the process was no different from the earlier work he had done, except for the length and the target demographic.

Reception

Critical reception
The show's reviews for season 1 have been mostly positive, scoring a 69 out of 100 with critics on Metacritic. On Rotten Tomatoes, the season has an approval rating of 90% with an average score of 7.5 out of 10 based on 42 reviews. The website's critical consensus reads, "Snarky and fast-paced with a surprisingly tender undercurrent and an engaging cast, Community is one of the best new comedies of the season."

Notably, David Bushman (Curator, Television) of the Paley Center for Media called Community the best new show of the fall season. Jonah Krakow of IGN gave the first season an 8.5 saying "Given the way Community eventually ramped up and delivered some amazing stories in the second half of the season, I'm extremely excited about what's to come for Season 2."

Awards and nominations

The show received a nomination for "Favorite New TV Comedy" at the 36th People's Choice Awards.
 Justin Lin received a nomination for "Outstanding Directing in a Comedy Series" at the 41st NAACP Image Awards for "Introduction to Statistics".

Nielsen ratings
The first season averaged 5 million viewers with a 2.4 rating in the 18–49 demographic and ranked #97 for the season.

DVD release
The first season of Community was released on DVD on September 21, 2010. The DVD contains all 25 episodes on four discs plus special features. Special features on the DVD include:

Commentary on every episode. Participants include creator Dan Harmon; cast members Joel McHale, Gillian Jacobs, Danny Pudi, Yvette Nicole Brown, Alison Brie, Donald Glover, Ken Jeong and Chevy Chase; directors Anthony Russo, Joe Russo and Adam Davidson; and writers Andrew Guest, Lauren Pomerantz, Hilary Winston, Karey Dornetto, Chris McKenna and Emily Cutler.
Outtakes
Season one cast evaluations
Season one highlight reel
 "Creative Compromises" featurette
 "Advanced Criminal Law" alternative scenes
Three mini episodes
 "Kickpuncher" comic book

References

External links 

 

Community (TV series) seasons
2009 American television seasons
2010 American television seasons